Euriphene tadema, the straw nymph, is a butterfly in the family Nymphalidae. It is found in Nigeria, Cameroon, Equatorial Guinea, Gabon, the Democratic Republic of the Congo, Uganda and Tanzania. The habitat consists of forests and secondary habitats.

Subspecies
Euriphene tadema tadema (southern Nigeria, Cameroon, Bioko, Gabon, Democratic Republic of the Congo)
Euriphene tadema nigropunctata (Aurivillius, 1901) (Uganda, north-western Tanzania, Democratic Republic of the Congo: Mongala, Uele, north Kivu, Tshopo, Equateur, Sankuru, Lualaba)

References

Butterflies described in 1866
Euriphene
Butterflies of Africa
Taxa named by William Chapman Hewitson